Warszewitsch's frog (Lithobates warszewitschii) is a species of frog in the family Ranidae found in Honduras, Nicaragua, Costa Rica, and Panama.

Description
The snout is pointed. They have large or small green patches on a golden brown background on their backs; the colouration darkens to brown along the sides. The dark area extends forward onto the face to form a "mask". They also have a light lip line. The dorsolateral folds have lighter colouration, usually golden or yellow. The feet are extensively webbed.

Habitat and conservation
Its natural habitats are humid lowland, montane, and gallery forests, where it is found near streams, but it can also be found far from streams. It can survive even in small forest patches. Some populations seem to have suffered from chytridiomycosis, but more recently recovered. It is also affected by habitat loss.

References

Further reading
 Hillis, D.M., & de Sá, R. (1984): Phylogeny and taxonomy of the Rana palmipes species group (Salientia: Ranidae). Herpetological Monographs 2: 1-26.

Lithobates
Amphibians of Costa Rica
Amphibians of Honduras
Amphibians of Nicaragua
Amphibians of Panama
Amphibians described in 1857
Taxonomy articles created by Polbot